ROH 15th Anniversary was the two-night 15th ROH Anniversary Show professional wrestling pay-per-view (PPV) event produced by the American wrestling promotion Ring of Honor. It took place on March 10 and 11, 2017, at the Sam's Town Live in the Las Vegas suburb of Sunrise Manor, Nevada. The first night was a pay-per-view broadcast, while the following night was a set of tapings for the ROH flagship program Ring of Honor Wrestling.

Storylines 
ROH 15th Anniversary features professional wrestling matches that involved wrestlers from pre-existing scripted feuds or storylines that play out on ROH's television program, Ring of Honor Wrestling. Wrestlers portrayed heroes (faces) or villains (heels) as they followed a series of events that built tension and culminated in a wrestling match or series of matches.

Results

Night 1 (PPV)

Night 2 (TV Tapings)

See also
 2017 in professional wrestling

References

Professional wrestling in the Las Vegas Valley
2017 in Nevada
Events in Sunrise Manor, Nevada
15
March 2017 events in the United States
2017 Ring of Honor pay-per-view events